Geek! is the debut EP by the alternative rock band My Bloody Valentine, released in December 1985 on Fever Records. It is the band's first release to feature bassist Debbie Googe.

Track listing

Personnel
All personnel credits adapted from Geek!s liner notes.

My Bloody Valentine
David Conway – vocals
Kevin Shields – guitar
Debbie Googe – bass
Colm Ó Cíosóig – drums

Technical personnel
My Bloody Valentine – production
Martin Davey – engineering

References

External links

1985 debut EPs
Fever Records EPs
My Bloody Valentine (band) EPs